The Arrondissement of Tongeren is one of the three administrative arrondissements in the Province of Limburg, Belgium. It is both an administrative and a judicial arrondissement. However, the Judicial Arrondissement of Tongeren comprises the municipalities of Tongeren, Bocholt, Bree, Kinrooi, Meeuwen-Gruitrode, Dilsen-Stokkem and Maaseik in the Arrondissement of Maaseik and the municipalities of As, Genk, Opglabbeek and Zutendaal in the Arrondissement of Hasselt.

The arrondissement was created in 1839 to form the Belgian part of the former arrondissement of Maastricht, which ceased to exist due to the splitting of Limburg. The canton of Borgloon was also moved from the arrondissement of Hasselt to the new arrondissement of Tongeren.

Municipalities

The Administrative Arrondissement of Tongeren consists of the following municipalities:

 Alken
 Bilzen
 Borgloon
 Heers
 Herstappe
 Hoeselt
 Kortessem

 Lanaken
 Maasmechelen
 Riemst
 Tongeren
 Voeren
 Wellen

References

Tongeren